Hanna Puley is a Canadian production and costume designer for theatre and film. She is most noted as a two-time Canadian Screen Award nominee for Best Costume Design, receiving nods at the 7th Canadian Screen Awards in 2019 for Octavio Is Dead! and at the 11th Canadian Screen Awards in 2023 for Brother.

Her other credits have included the films She Stoops to Conquer, Run This Town, The Swearing Jar and Blackberry, the television series Nirvanna the Band the Show, and the web series Space Riders: Division Earth and Ghost BFF.

References

External links

Canadian costume designers
Canadian production designers
Canadian theatre designers
Canadian women in film
Living people
Women production designers
Women costume designers